St. Jerome Parish Church (also known as Morong Church) is a Roman Catholic church located in Morong, Rizal, Philippines. It was built during the Spanish period in the country, with stones from a hill called Kay Ngaya; lime from the stones of the mountain Kay Maputi; and sand and gravel from Morong River.

History 
The town of Morong traces its origins to the pioneering work of the Franciscans Juan de Plasencia and Diego de Oropesa. Both were responsible for starting most of the lake town mission in 1578. They constructed chapels attached to a bigger settlement to allow religious and civil administration. Later, this settlement was converted into Pueblo de Morong and was made the provincial capital of the Franciscan Order at that time. Baras, Tanay, Pililla, Cardona, Binangonan and Teresa were the  under Pueblo de Morong.

Fr. Plasencia was well known for his mastery of Tagalog and is credited with compiling a dictionary of the vernacular and writing a draft of a catechism which is later used for composing the Doctrina Christiana (1593), the first book printed in the Philippines.

It was not until 1586 that Morong had a friar named Fr. Blas de la Madre de Dios assigned as first minister of the pueblo. He constructed a wooden church on the south bank of the river, but it was burned down together with a large part of the pueblo in 1612. After three years, a new church was built of stone and mortar on elevated ground at the opposite bank of Morong River which ensured its safety from floods and fires. It measured 42 varas long by 12 varas wide, had a single nave with semi-circular apse, built under the direction of Chinese master craftsmen. The church, dedicated to St. Jerome, was completed in 1620. The church had remained substantially unchanged until 1850–53, when Fr. Máximo Rico commissioned Bartolomé Palatino, a native of Paete, to renovate the facade and build a bell tower.

The new Baroque facade with a towering height of 20 varas was completed on February 2, 1853, almost three years after its construction.

The Order of the Franciscan Missionaries were first assigned in the church of Morong. As a proof, the Franciscan coat or arms is seen on the main facade of the bell tower, the hands of Jesus and St. Francis of Assisi.
Next were Columban Missionaries.

Significance of the Church during Filipino-Spanish War
After the Cry of Pugadlawin on August 23, 1896, a civil guard stationed in Binangonan named Agustin Natividad escaped from his post and passed the mountain trails to reach Morong. He organized a camp with other Filipino civil guards and attacked Morong. The Spanish casadores and other loyal civil guards retreated to the Gobierno Politico-Militar building while the Katipuneros under Natividad sought refuge in Capitan Mariano's rice camarin. Due to lack of food and arms, they left with their families and attacked Morong Church and forced the enemies to retreat inside the convent and church.

On June 1, 1898, fully armed soldiers from Cavite and a shipment of rifles and a canon arrived to aid the Katipuneros who came from the different points of Distrito de Morong. The three principal revolutionary leaders at that time were Brigade Commander Miguel Aquino, Assessor Juan Sumulong and Quintin Gonzales. Firing went on as the Spaniards took their stand in the church and convent.

The Spaniards besieged in the church and convent surrendered to the Katipuneros on August 19, 1898.

Architecture 

The Morong facade and bell tower is one of the most striking of all church facades along Laguna de Bay. Frequently photographed and is properly described as Baroque Revival architecture. The central portion of the facade surges outward and the catenated balustrade above give the whole a dynamic felling. Various decorative elements, some Mexican in origin, give the facade a richness characteristic of Baroque. Four angels, representing the cardinal virtues, stand at the corners of the bell tower. Fr. Felix Huerta, writing in 1852, states that the facade had finials shaped as jars and shells used for illuminating it.

It is said that it was built by Chinese craftsmen as evidence: two Chinese lion sculptures (a boy and a girl lion) at the entrance to the steep driveway. One lion, said to be the girl lion, was stolen between 2000 and 2005. Local folklore said that the female lion has a hidden treasure inside it. While the other lion, the male lion, is safeguarded at the St. Jerome school vicinity.

The stone and mortar church which has a three-story facade, and an octagonal bell tower whose cross is illuminated at night and can be seen from the surrounding countryside. The bell tower of the church is used by local fisher man in the nearby towns as a light house when fishing at night and during the storm. Its Frontispiece and the belfry were renovated by Bartolome Palatino of Paete, between 1850 and 1853.

An added attraction in the church of Morong is the first class relic of the town's patron saint Saint Jerome; (Patron of scholars of the bible, Saint who translated the bible, feast day: September 30). The first class relic (a part of the saint's body) was given to the parish year 2005, through the effort of then parish priest Rev. Fr. Lawrence "Larry" Paz, when they had their first pilgrimage tour to holy land and Vatican City.

The relic is publicly exposed every Saturday during the anticipated mass, guarded by the knights of Saint Jerome. While the kissing of the relic is done every last Saturday of the month. After two years, another relic was given, in 2007 to the parish again as a gift from the main chaplain of the church of St. Jerome in Rome, this time bigger. This relic is now buried on top of the table of the main altar which is being kissed by the priest every time there is a mass.

Renovations
The following were the most significant projects done according to the records of the parish:

Locals 
It was within this cultural landmark that a local theater group took residence and began to nurture the several local artists who continue to share their talents and expertise in theater, television, media and education. Founded in 1998 by Fr. Felipe Pedraja and the local church choir KISAP, the Dulaang San Geronimo (DSG) is an organization committed to artistic excellence and a people's culture that fosters both personal fulfillment and social transformation in the province of Rizal. The architecture of the church influenced the diversity of performances that they produced, prompting the artists to explore possibilities that the unique architecture had to offer.

Gallery

References

External links

 Website of Morong, Rizal
 Saint Jerome Parish on Facebook

Roman Catholic churches in Rizal
Churches in the Roman Catholic Diocese of Antipolo